Centre for Mathematical Sciences may refer to:

Centre for Mathematical Sciences (Cambridge)
Centre for Mathematical Sciences (Kerala), India
International Centre for Mathematical Sciences, Edinburgh, UK